Kobjeglava is a village west of Štanjel in the Municipality of Komen in the Littoral region of Slovenia next to the border with Italy.

Name
Kobjeglava was attested in written sources in 1300 as Cobila glaua and in 1349 as Cublaglauua. The name is derived from reduction of *Kobilja glava 'mare's head', based on a metaphorical motivation.

Church
The parish church in the settlement is dedicated to Saint Michael and belongs to the Koper Diocese.

References

External links
Kobjeglava on Geopedia

Populated places in the Municipality of Komen